"Another Op'nin', Another Show" is the opening number of Cole Porter's 1948 musical Kiss Me, Kate.

Sung by a band of players performing a musical adaption of Shakespeare's The Taming of the Shrew, the song has become regarded as a show business anthem on a level with "That's Entertainment!" (from The Band Wagon) and "There's No Business Like Show Business" (from Annie Get Your Gun).  However, it was not included in the 1953 film version of the musical, except as an instrumental dance number from the song "why can't you behave". Porter insisted that the song be used in the film.

Adelaide Hall, playing the role of Hattie, sang Another Op'nin', Another Show on the West-End stage (400 times) when the London production of Kiss Me, Kate opened on 8 March 1951 at the Coliseum Theatre where it ran for 400 performances.

Patricia Morison (who starred in the original Broadway production of Kiss Me Kate), Marin Mazzie, and Hannah Waddingham have all performed versions of the song. It was also the opening number of episode 514 of The Muppet Show

References

1948 songs
Songs written by Cole Porter
Songs from Kiss Me, Kate